Chandra Bharati hills are a series of hills located in North Guwahati.

Etymology
This hills are an abode of medieval litterateur Chandra Bharati after which it named.

Place of interest
Doul Govinda Temple located in its foot hills is a major tourist place.

See also
 Bhattadeva

References

Hills of Assam
Kamrup region